Richard Hampden  (aft. 1674 – 27 July 1728) of Great Hampden, near Wendover, Buckinghamshire was an English Whig politician who sat in the House of Commons almost continuously from 1701 to 1728.

Early life

Hampden was the eldest son of John Hampden, and his first wife Sarah Foley, daughter of Thomas Foley of Witley Court, Worcestershire. He was  great-grandson of Ship money tax protestor John Hampden. His younger half-brother was John Hampden, MP. In 1696, he succeeded his father to the Wendover estate and Hampden House. He studied at Utrecht in 1699. In 1701, he married  his cousin Isabella Ellys,  daughter of Sir William Ellys, 2nd Baronet, MP of Wyham and Nocton, Lincolnshire.

Career
Hampden was returned unopposed as MP for Wendover at the two general elections of 1701, and was elected in contest in 1703 and 1705. At the 1708 general election, he was returned unopposed as MP for Buckinghamshire but was defeated in contests in 1710 and 1713.  In 1710 he was offered  a seat on the Treasury Commission  but  refused. He then  quarreled with  the Queen, urging  her not to dissolve  Parliament. Anne made the  crushing  retort that "though  she  had offered  him employment  she had not asked for  his advice". He was returned as MP for Berwick-on-Tweed at a by-election on 22 December 1711 and at the 1713 general election.

Hampden was returned unopposed as MP for Buckinghamshire again at the 1715 general election. In 1716 he was appointed Teller of the Exchequer. In 1718, he was sworn of the Privy Council and appointed Treasurer of the Navy. In 1719 he was one of the original backers of the Royal Academy of Music, establishing a London opera company which commissioned numerous works from Handel and others. In 1720, he speculated in the stock of the South Sea Company using naval funds to make a personal profit. When the South Sea Bubble burst, he made losses of £90,000, of which less than half was secured. He was consequentially dismissed from office. In 1722 he was elected MP at Wendover and in 1727, he was returned unopposed at Wendover and elected without his knowledge at Buckinghamshire and chose to sit for the latter.

Hampden died on 27 July 1728.

References

1670s births
1728 deaths
People from Buckinghamshire
English MPs 1701
English MPs 1701–1702
English MPs 1702–1705
English MPs 1705–1707
Members of the Parliament of Great Britain for English constituencies
British MPs 1707–1708
British MPs 1708–1710
British MPs 1710–1713
British MPs 1713–1715
British MPs 1715–1722
British MPs 1722–1727
British MPs 1727–1734
Members of the Privy Council of Great Britain